Ryan Nicholas Sandes "Hedgie" (born 10 March 1982 in Cape Town) is a South African trail runner. In 2010 he became the first competitor to have won all four of the 4 Deserts races, each a 6/7-day,  self-supported footrace through the Atacama Desert in Chile, the Gobi Desert in China, the Sahara Desert in Egypt, and lastly Antarctica. His achievement prompted Mary Gadams, founder and CEO of RacingThePlanet and organiser of the event, to state “Ryan Sandes is clearly one of the top endurance athletes in the world - to have won all 4 Deserts is a remarkable accomplishment.” To date only 81 individuals have completed all four trails. 11 competitors have managed the 4 Deserts Grand Slam, that is, completing the four trails in a calendar year (from 1 January to 31 December of the same year). In 2010, Time magazine included the 4 Deserts Challenge on a list of the ten most demanding endurance races in the world.

Sandes was winner of the Sahara Race in 2008, the Gobi March in 2008, second in 2009 RacingThePlanet Namibia, and winner of the Jungle Ultra Marathon in Floresta Nacional do Tapajós in Pará, Brazil, setting a new course record. He set a record time for the 4Peaks Mountain Challenge in 2010.

Sandes won the 2011 Leadville Trail 100 in a time of 16:46:54, more than half an hour ahead of runner-up Dylan Bowman. He won the 2012 North Face 100 in Australia in a time of 9:22:45, and had placed 3rd in 2011.

In August 2012, Sandes bettered Russell Pasche's record for the 90K Fish River Canyon hiking trail from 10:54 to 6:57.

Sandes won the second race in the Ultra-Trail World Series Tour, The North Face Transgrancanaria, on March 1, 2014. After winning, Sandes was temporarily disqualified after a misunderstanding relating to his failing to produce the mandatory emergency blanket from his kit at the finish. Sandes appealed the disqualification and was subsequently reinstated as the winner.

Sandes attended the South African College Schools (S.A.C.S.) where he took part in cricket, rugby and water polo. He was awarded a BSc degree in Construction and later an Honours in Quantity Surveying at the University of Cape Town. In addition to trail running, he is an active mountain biker, paddler and surfer.

Having finished runner-up in the 2012 Western States Endurance Run, Sandes won the race five years later in 16 hours 19 minutes 37 seconds.

The trail running pair set a fastest known time (FKT) on the Drakensberg Grand Traverse (DGT), an unmarked and self-navigated route across the main Drakensberg escarpment between South Africa and Lesotho. The route included approximately 204 km of distance and 9000m of elevation gain/loss. This FKT was set between 00:00 on Monday, 24 March 2014 and sunset on Tuesday 25 March 2014, with a finish time of 41 hours and 49 minutes. The pair slept only a few minutes during the middle-part of the race, and famously reported of hallucinating from tiredness and hearing helicopters during the night, although there weren't any.

Running a total of 1,504 km in 24 days 4 hours and 24 minutes, Ryan Sandes and Ryno Griesel set a new FKT during March 2018 for the Great Himalaya Trail (GHT).

References

External links
Ryan Sandes homepage
2010 interview
The Beauty of the Irrational - Racing through the Fish River Canyon in Namibia
Travailen - Official Trailer - "Travailen" follows Ryan Sandes and Ryno Griesel's on their attempt of the Drakensberg Grand Traverse (DGT)
 Drakensberg Grand traverse stats

1982 births
South African ultramarathon runners
Male ultramarathon runners
Living people
Alumni of South African College Schools